Zabrus albanicus is a species ground beetle in the Pterostichinae subfamily that can be found in Albania (Prisren-Dieck) and all states of former Yugoslavia (except Croatia and Slovenia).

Subspecies
There are four subspecies of Z. albanicus:
 Z. albanicus albanicus Apfelbeck, 1904
 Z. albanicus jablanicensis Maran, 1939
 Z. albanicus jakupicensis Maran, 1939
 Z. albanicus latifanus Ganglbauer, 1915

References

Beetles described in 1904
Beetles of Europe